Military Medicine is a monthly peer-reviewed medical journal covering all aspects of medicine in military settings. It is published by Oxford University Press on behalf of the Association of Military Surgeons of the United States. It was established in 1891 and the editor-in-chief is Stephen W. Rothwell.

History 
The journal was established in 1891 as Transactions of the ... Annual Meeting of the Association of Military Surgeons of the National Guard of the United States. The title was changed to Journal of the Association of Military Surgeons of the United States from 1901 to 1906, and then to Military Surgeon from 1907 to 1954, when it obtained its current title.

Abstracting and indexing
The journal is abstracted and indexed in:

According to the Journal Citation Reports, the journal has a 2021 impact factor of 1.563.

References

External links

1891 establishments in the United States
Emergency medicine journals
English-language journals
Oxford University Press academic journals
Military medicine in the United States
Monthly journals
Publications established in 1891